Pleasure is a Norwegian pop band, led by Fred Ball. One single was released in 2003, "Don't Look The Other Way", which featured Justine Frischmann (former lead singer for Elastica) on vocals.

Discography
Pleasure 1 (August 8, 2003)
 "Don't Look the Other Way"
 "From the Country to the City"
 "All I Want"
 "Stories"
 "Memory"
 "Sensitivity"
 "You Got to Love Someone"
 "I'm Confused"
 "Disco Doctor"
 "Visionary"

Pleasure 2 (unknown, 2007)
 "Intro"
 "Alright All Night"
 "Out of Love"
 "Throw It All Away"
 "Back to You"
 "Uptown"
 "Bite the Beat"
 "Silk Dream"
 "Eskimo Kiss"
 "Finest Thing"
 "NYCSC"
 "Nightvision"

Norwegian musical groups